Raymond Arnold Ross (born January 11, 1932) is a Canadian former professional hockey player who played for the Cleveland Barons, Pittsburgh Hornets and Providence Reds in the American Hockey League, totalling 542 games. He also played for the Edmonton Flyers, Saskatoon/St. Paul Regals, and Vancouver Canucks in the Western Hockey League.

External links
 

1932 births
Sportspeople from Hamilton, Ontario
Ice hockey people from Ontario
Cleveland Barons (1937–1973) players
Providence Reds players
Pittsburgh Hornets players
Edmonton Flyers (WHL) players
Saskatoon Regals/St. Paul Saints players
Vancouver Canucks (WHL) players
Canadian ice hockey centres
Living people